24 Divisadero is a trolleybus line operated by the San Francisco Municipal Railway (Muni).

Route description
From the northern terminus at Jackson and Webster, the route runs west to Divisadero and then turns south. It continues onto Castro Street until 26th Street, then runs on a complicated route of 26th, Noe, 30th, Mission Street, Cortland, Bayshore, Industrial, and Palou. The outbound terminus is adjacent to the Muni Metro Oakdale/Palou station on Third Street.

The 24 Divisadero runs between Hunters Point in the south and Pacific Heights in the north. The line includes the single steepest known grade on any existing trolley bus line in the world: 22.8% in the block of Noe Street between Cesar Chavez Street and 26th Street.

The route operates 24 hours with less frequent short turn Owl service overnight as part of the All Nighter network.

History
The 24 Divisadero was established on April 6, 1941, by the Market Street Railway as a replacement for the Castro Street cable car. In 1982, as part of broader system changes, the line was extended to Third and Palou via Cortland.

References

External links

 24 Divisadero — via SFMTA

San Francisco Municipal Railway trolleybus routes
1941 establishments in California